Guillaume et les sortilèges is a 2007 French film directed by Pierre Léon.

Cast
Valérie Crunchant	
Guillaume Verdier
Laurent Lacotte
Serge Bozon

Production credits
Directed by Pierre Léon
Writing credits : Pierre Léon

External links

2007 films
French drama films
2000s French films